Modiolarca impacta is a species of saltwater clam, a mussel, a marine bivalve mollusk in the family Mytilidae, the mussels.

References 

 Powell A. W. B., New Zealand Mollusca, William Collins Publishers Ltd, Auckland, New Zealand 1979 

Mytilidae
Bivalves of New Zealand
Molluscs described in 1782